Pablo Rafael Ruz Gutiérrez (born Madrid, 1975) is a Spanish judge. He is best known for his part in investigating the Gurtel corruption scandal (previously handled by Baltasar Garzón and Antonio Pedreira) and the related Barcenas affair, but has handled other prominent cases.

He was educated at Comillas Pontifical University. In 2008, while still in his 20s, he was appointed to Spain's central criminal court, the Audiencia Nacional, on a temporary basis.
He was re-appointed in 2010, filling the vacancy left by Baltasar Garzón. Although the appointment was again on an interim basis, he served there until 2015, when he took up a position in Móstoles.

Media portrayal
Ruz was portrayed by the actor Manolo Solo in the 2015 film B, la película. Soto won the Unión de Actores prize for best supporting actor (mejor actor de reparto de cine) and  received a nomination in the same category (interpretación masculina de reparto) in the Goya Awards (Spain's principal national film awards).

References

Living people
21st-century Spanish judges
Comillas Pontifical University alumni
1975 births